The Rio de Janeiro antwren (Myrmotherula fluminensis) is a species of bird in the family Thamnophilidae.
It is endemic to Brazil, and is currently thought only to survive in Guapi Açu Ecological Reserve, although identification is tricky and its continued survival has been questioned.

Its natural habitat is subtropical or tropical moist lowland forest.  It is threatened by habitat loss.

References

External links

 BirdLife Species Factsheet.

Myrmotherula
Birds of the Atlantic Forest
Endemic birds of Brazil
Critically endangered animals
Critically endangered biota of South America
Birds described in 1988
Taxonomy articles created by Polbot
Taxobox binomials not recognized by IUCN